Purcell is an unincorporated community in Johnson Township, Knox County, Indiana.

History
A post office was established as Purcell's in 1871, and remained in operation until it was discontinued in 1901. The community was named for Andrew Purcell, the original owner of the town site.

Geography

References

Unincorporated communities in Knox County, Indiana
Unincorporated communities in Indiana